The 2001 Rally Finland (formally the 51st Neste Rally Finland) was the ninth round of the 2001 World Rally Championship. The race was held over three days between 24 August and 26 August 2001, and was won by Peugeot's Marcus Grönholm, his 5th win in the World Rally Championship.

Background

Entry list

Itinerary
All dates and times are EEST (UTC+3).

Results

Overall

World Rally Cars

Classification

Special stages

Championship standings

FIA Cup for Production Rally Drivers

Classification

Special stages

Championship standings

FIA Cup for Super 1600 Drivers

Classification

Special stages

Championship standings

References

External links 
 Official website of the World Rally Championship

Rally Finland
Finland
Rally